Muxika is a railway station in Muxika, Basque Country, Spain. It is owned by Euskal Trenbide Sarea and operated by Euskotren. It lies on the Urdaibai line.

History 
In 2018, the station was renovated in order to improve its accessibility.

Services 
The station is served by Euskotren Trena line E4. It runs every 30 minutes (in each direction) during weekdays, and every hour during weekends.

References

External links
 

Euskotren Trena stations
Railway stations in Biscay
Railway stations in Spain opened in 1888